Dorcaschematini is a tribe of longhorn beetles of the subfamily Lamiinae.

Genera
Biolib lists:
 Brachyolenecamptus Breuning, 1948
 Cylindrecamptus Breuning, 1940
 Cylindrepomus Blanchard, 1853
 Dorcaschema Haldeman, 1847
 Falsocularia Breuning, 1942
 Macrocamptus Dillon & Dillon, 1948
 Microlenecamptus Pic, 1924
 Momisofalsus Pic, 1950
 Olenecamptus Chevrolat, 1835

References

 
Lamiinae